Sergei Borisovich Shishkin (born 10 February 1973) is a Russian professional football coach and a former player.

Playing career
He made his professional debut in the Soviet Second League in 1991 for FC Dynamo Yakutsk.

References

Soviet footballers
Russian footballers
PFC Krylia Sovetov Samara players
FC Elista players
FC Fakel Voronezh players
FC Lada-Tolyatti players
1973 births
Living people
People from Yakutsk
Russian Premier League players
Russian football managers
Association football midfielders
Association football defenders
PFC CSKA Moscow players
FC Spartak Nizhny Novgorod players
Sportspeople from Sakha